Epitrichosma phaulera is a species of moth of the family Tortricidae. It is found in Australia, where it has been recorded from Queensland.

The wingspan is about 12 mm. The forewings are whitish grey, with fuscous irroration (speckling) and a rather large basal patch indicated by fuscous irroration. The hindwings are grey whitish.

References

Moths described in 1916
Schoenotenini